TraxX (formerly known as The TRAX and TRAX), was a South Korean EDM trio that consisted of Jay, Jungmo and Ginjo. Originally a four-member rock band formed by SM Entertainment and X Japan's co-founder Yoshiki in 2004, it consisted of Typhoon Jay (vocals), Rose Minwoo (drums, percussion), Attack Jungwoo (bass guitar), and Xmas Jungmo (guitar, bass guitar). Their name is an acronym of "Typhoon Rose Attack Xmas", the members' nicknames.

No Min-woo and Jungwoo left the band in the period between 2006 and 2007. This resulted in the band becoming a duo with the remaining members being Jay and Jungmo. They changed their band name from The TRAX to simply TRAX. The duo kicked off with the release of the EPs Cold-Hearted Man (2010), Oh! My Goddess (2010), and Blind (2011). Thereafter, the members went into individual activities, with Jay pursuing acting and Jungmo collaborating with several artists.

On March 26, 2018, TRAX changed their name to TraxX with DJ and record producer Ginjo joining the band and changing their music genre from rock to electronic dance music. TraxX unofficially disbanded after 2 members left SM in April 2019.

History

Pre-debut
Typhoon, Rose, and Attack were introduced initially to the public through in the 2002 Survival Audition HeeJun vs. KangTa Battle of the Century. The three-members were formed to debut as rock band. With the addition of X-mas, the four-member would debuted as rock band The Trax. Before making their official debuted, they made appearance on their labelmates song BoA's "Rock With You" which released in December 2003.

2004–07: Debut and First Rain
TRAX released their debut single Paradox on July 20, 2004. A few days after debuted, they held their concert on July 26 and on July 31.

Their second single Scorpio was simultaneously releases on November 14 in Japan and November 17 in South Korea.

TRAX released their second Japanese single Rhapsody on April 20, 2005. Their third Japanese single, Blaze Away was released on September 14.

On May 10, 2006, drummer Rose (No Min-woo) left the band to pursue other interests. The remaining three-members release their first full-length album First Rain on July 20.

The band released their fourth 
Japanese single "Resolution" on August 3.

The band continue released their fifth Japanese single "Cold Rain" on January 24, 2007. Shortly afterwards, Attack (Kang Jung-woo) left from the band.

2008–10: Cold-Hearted Man and Oh! My Goddess 
In late 2008, vocalist Typhoon and guitarist X-Mas joined Super Junior members Heechul and Kangin as regulars in Mnet's television series Band of Brothers. In 2009, X-Mas was also cast on a short-lived show called Oppa Band along with Super Junior member Sungmin.

They released a digital single as a project band called TRAX+Air for the Korean drama Swallow the Sun.

On January 25, 2010, they released their EP Cold-Hearted Man with lead single "Let You Go". It contains songs written and composed by both Typhoon and X-Mas, and features artists such as SHINee's Key, Wheesung and T-MAX's Shin Min-chul.

In August 2010, TRAX became a special guest for Super Junior's third Asian tour, Super Show 3 on some tour dates, performing in the bridge of the song "Don't Don".

TRAX released the EP Oh! My Goddess on September 6, 2010.

They recorded song "Tell Me Your Love" for KBS's drama Mary Stayed Out All Night, featuring Moon Geun-young and Jang Keun-suk.

2011–12: Blind and hiatus
TRAX's third EP Blind was released on November 10, 2011.

On March 26, 2012, Typhoon (Jay) enlisted for his two-year mandatory military service. He received four weeks of basic military training in Busan and then continued to serve as a public service worker. X-Mas (Kim Jung-mo) enlisted seven months later, on October 25, 2012. They were originally scheduled to enlist together, but Jung-mo's scoliosis condition and a fractured collarbone delayed his enlistment. He served non-active duty as a public service worker for 23 months after completing four weeks of basic training. Due to the members' enlistment in the military, the band took a hiatus.

2015–19: Reformation as EDM trio and disbandment
In July 2015, TRAX returned to performing in their agency concert SM Town Live World Tour IV for the first time after a three-year hiatus.

On January 7, they released the digital single "Road" as a part of SM Entertainment's project SM Station. This marked their first release since Blind (2011).

On February 23, 2018, TRAX released their first and only EDM single "Notorious" with LIP2SHOT featuring Sophiya, as a part of SM Entertainment project SM Station.

On March 26, 2018, it was announced that TRAX changed their name to TraxX with addition DJ and producer Ginjo to the group and would transform their music genre from rock to EDM. On December 12, TraxX released their English-language single "Escape", which marked their first release since their revamp as an EDM trio.

On April 30, 2019, Jay and Jungmo left SM Entertainment after their contracts expired and effectly the band disbanded.

Band members

 Jay — vocals 
 Rose — drums, percussion 
 Attack  — bass guitar 
 Jungmo — guitar ; bass guitar 
 Ginjo — DJ

Timeline

Discography

Studio albums

Extended plays

Singles

As featured artist

Soundtrack appearances

Concerts

Headlining
 TRAX 1st Concert (July 24, 2004)
 TRAX 2nd Concert (July 31, 2004)

Concert participation
SM Summer Town Festival (2006) 
SM Town Summer Concert (2007)
SM Town Live '08 (2008–2009)
SM Town Live '10 World Tour (2010–2011)
SM Town Live World Tour III (2012)
SM Town Live World Tour IV (2015)
SM Town Live World Tour V (2016)
SM Town Live World Tour VI (2017)

Related publications
1st Story Book - BLAST (December 1, 2004)

Awards and nominations

Notes

References

External links
 Official website

SM Town
Avex Group artists
South Korean pop rock music groups
South Korean rock music groups
South Korean heavy metal musical groups
Musical groups established in 2004
Musical groups disestablished in 2019
SM Entertainment artists
Musical groups from Seoul
South Korean musical trios